The C-class ferries (also known as Cowichan class) are a class of five double-ended roll-on/roll-off ferries operated by BC Ferries in the Strait of Georgia in British Columbia, all constructed between 1976 and 1981. When the vessels were first built, they were the largest ships of their kind in the world. Each vessel's two MaK 12M551AK engines produce 11,860 HP, which provides a service speed of 22 knots.

C-class vessels
The first two C-class ferries were Queen of Coquitlam and Queen of Cowichan, constructed in 1976. Queen of Oak Bay and Queen of Surrey were built in 1981. There were some minor modifications to the design of the two later ships compared to the earlier C-class ships; most noticeably, Queen of Oak Bay and Queen of Surrey both have longer passenger decks than their older sisters. The C-class vessels were designed by Philip F. Spaulding and are similar to the Jumbo-class ferries he designed for Washington State Ferries several years earlier.

Queen of Alberni was also constructed in 1976 along with the first two C-class vessels. Although this ferry is considered to be a C-class vessel, it is significantly different in layout. It was originally designed to carry only overheight (truck) traffic but in 1984, an upper car deck was installed for 150 non-overheight vehicles.

Queen of Coquitlam, Queen of Cowichan, Queen of Oak Bay, and Queen of Surrey each received extensive mid-life upgrades in 2003, 2004, 2005, and 2006 respectively. Queen of Alberni also received a similar upgrade in 2007. From engine work to major modifications and improvements, the vessels were refitted to provide an additional 20 years of service.

In July 2018, BC Ferries announced that it had issued a request for proposals to build replacement vessels for all C-class ships, with deliveries beginning in 2024.

Routes
C-class ferries are double-ended; they have a separate bridge at each end and therefore are not required to turn around during the sailing. These ferries generally run on the Duke Point–Tsawwassen, Horseshoe Bay–Departure Bay and Horseshoe Bay–Langdale routes. At one time, these ferries operated on the Swartz Bay–Tsawwassen route, but due to limitations placed on their speed when transiting Active Pass—after an accident they were required to operate in the more maneuverable docking mode rather than cruising mode—it is no longer feasible to run them on that route.

Incidents and accidents

On August 9, 1979, Queen of Alberni was transiting through Active Pass when it ran aground on Galiano Island, tipping fifteen degrees to starboard.  Several large commercial vehicles on board the vessel at the time were damaged.  No persons were injured, but a racehorse onboard was killed.

She also gained the distinction of being the only BC Ferries vessel to have issued a mayday from drydock.

On August 12, 1985, three people were killed when Queen of Cowichan ran over a pleasure boat near the Horseshoe Bay terminal.

In June 1989, Queen of Alberni collided with the loading dock at Departure Bay causing significant damage to the ship and dock. Six people were injured including a cook who suffered a fractured cheekbone as he was walking down a set of stairs.

On March 12, 1992, at 8:08 am (16:08 UTC), Queen of Alberni collided with the Japanese freighter Shinwa Maru southwest of Tsawwassen.  The collision occurred in heavy fog, with both vessels suffering minor damage.  Injuries included 2 serious and 25 minor injuries for the 260 people on the ferry, while none of the 11 people aboard the freighter received injuries.

In October 1994, Queen of Surrey crashed into the dock at Horseshoe Bay, causing $200,000 in damage.

On October 20, 1995, Queen of Coquitlam experienced an engine shut-down while approaching Horseshoe Bay.  She crashed into a dock at the terminal resulting in light damage.

On December 15, 2001, Queen of Alberni got caught in a heavy wind storm which turned a regular 2-hour crossing into a 7-hour ordeal.

On May 12, 2003, Queen of Surrey was disabled as a result of an engine room fire. Queen of Capilano was dispatched and tethered to Queen of Surrey while tugboats were dispatched. The vessel was then towed back to shore.  None of the 318 passengers were injured, but several crew members were treated for minor injuries. Some buckling of the main car deck resulted from the heat of the fire. However, no vehicles were damaged in the incident.

On July 31, 2003, Queen of Surrey experienced a mechanical problem with one of its propellers.  As a result, she was removed from service for emergency dry-docking to facilitate repairs, which took about five days.

On June 30, 2005, Queen of Oak Bay lost power while approaching the Horseshoe Bay ferry terminal.  After the captain gave ample warning, the ship coasted into the nearby Sewell's Marina, where it overran more than a dozen boats before running aground.  No one was injured, and the ferry sustained only minor scraping to a rudder and propeller blade.  See  for extensive details on this accident.

References

External links
BC Ferries: The Queens of Coquitlam, Cowichan and Oak Bay: More than a new look
The Ferry Terminal - Ferries of British Columbia
The Ferry Terminal - Ferries of BC: Queen of Alberni, Queen of Coquitlam, Queen of Cowichan, Queen of Oak Bay, and Queen of Surrey
 BC Ferries and Ships on the BC Coast (very extensive photo galleries)

 
Ferry classes